The Florida Film Critics Circle Award for Best Cinematography is an award given by the Florida Film Critics Circle to honor the finest achievements in filmmaking.

Winners

1990s

2000s

2010s

2020s

Florida Film Critics Circle Awards
Awards for best cinematography